Václav Fišer (born 9 July 1947) is a retired Czechoslovak long jumper and triple jumper.

He was born in Klatovy and represented the club Dukla Praha. He finished fifth at the 1971 European Championships, tenth at the 1972 European Indoor Championships, and competed at the 1972 Olympic Games without reaching the final.

He became Czechoslovak champion in long jump in 1970 and Czechoslovak champion in triple jump in 1971 and Czechoslovak indoor champion in 1972. His personal best jump was 16.62 metres, achieved in 1972.

References

1947 births
Living people
People from Klatovy
Czechoslovak male triple jumpers
Czechoslovak male long jumpers
Athletes (track and field) at the 1972 Summer Olympics
Olympic athletes of Czechoslovakia
Sportspeople from the Plzeň Region